Yesterday, Today and Tomorrow is a 1963 comedy anthology film by Italian director Vittorio De Sica. It stars Sophia Loren and Marcello Mastroianni. The film consists of three short stories about couples in different parts of Italy. The film won the Academy Award for Best Foreign Language Film at the 37th Academy Awards.

Plot

Adelina of Naples
Set in a working-class Naples neighborhood in 1954, this is the story of Adelina (Sophia Loren), who supports her unemployed husband Carmine (Marcello Mastroianni) and child by selling black market cigarettes. When she doesn't pay a fine, her furniture is to be repossessed.  However her neighbors assist her by hiding the furniture. A lawyer who lives in the neighborhood advises Carmine that, as the fine and furniture are in Adelina's name, she will be imprisoned. However, Italian law stipulates that women cannot be imprisoned when pregnant or within six months after a pregnancy. As a result, Adelina schemes to stay pregnant continuously. After seven children in eight years, Carmine is seriously exhausted and Adelina must make the choice of being impregnated by their mutual friend Pasquale (Aldo Giuffrè) or be incarcerated.

She finally chooses to be incarcerated, and the whole neighborhood gathers money to free her and petition for her pardon, which finally comes and she is reunited with her husband Carmine and their children.

Anna of Milan
Anna (Sophia Loren dressed by Christian Dior), the wife of a mega-rich industrialist, has a lover named Renzo (Marcello Mastroianni).  Whilst driving together in her husband's Rolls-Royce, Anna must determine which is the most important to her happiness – Renzo or the Rolls. Renzo rethinks his infatuation with Anna when she expresses no concern when they nearly run over a child, and end up crashing the Rolls-Royce.

She is infuriated by the damage to her Rolls-Royce, and ends up getting another passing driver to take her home, leaving Renzo on the road.

Mara of Rome
Mara (Sophia Loren) works as a prostitute from her apartment, servicing a variety of high class clients including Augusto (Marcello Mastroianni), the wealthy, powerful and neurotic son of a Bologna industrialist.

Mara's elderly neighbor's grandson Umberto (Gianni Ridolfi) is a handsome and callow young man studying for the priesthood but not yet ordained. Umberto and Mara talk one night asking each other about their occupations. Embarrassed, Mara tells him she does manicures. Umberto's grandmother (Tina Pica) sees them talking and, knowing that Mara is a prostitute, interrupts their conversation telling Mara that she'll go to hell. Umberto protests, but Mara defends herself. Umberto falls in love with her. To the shrieking dismay of his grandmother, the young man wishes to leave his vocation to be with Mara, or to join the French Foreign Legion, if Mara rejects him.  Mara vows to set the young man on the path of righteousness back to the seminary and vows celibacy for a week, if she succeeds. For this, she enlists the reluctant Augusto. Umberto finally agrees to return to the seminary. Mara rewards Augusto with a striptease (with Loren coached by Jacques Ruet choreographer of Le Crazy Horse de Paris), but remembering her vow, refuses to go to bed with him.

Cast
 Sophia Loren as Adelina Sbaratti / Anna Molteni / Mara
 Marcello Mastroianni as Carmine Sbaratti / Renzo / Augusto Rusconi
 Aldo Giuffrè as Pasquale Nardella (segment "Adelina")
 Agostino Salvietti as Dr. Verace (segment "Adelina")
 Lino Mattera as Amedeo Scapece (segment "Adelina")
 Tecla Scarano as Verace's sister (segment "Adelina")
 Silvia Monelli as Elivira Nardella (segment "Adelina")
 Carlo Croccolo as Auctioneer (segment "Adelina")
 Pasquale Cennamo as Chief Police (segment "Adelina")
 Tonino Cianci as (segment "Adelina") (as Antonio Cianci)
 Armando Trovajoli as Giorgio Ferrario (segment "Anna")
 Tina Pica as Grandmother Ferrario (segment "Mara")
 Gianni Ridolfi as Umberto (segment "Mara") (as Giovanni Ridolfi)
 Gennaro Di Gregorio as Grandfather (segment "Mara")

Reception
John Simon of The New Leader described Yesterday, Today and Tomorrow as an 'overrated dud'.

Awards
 1965 Academy Award for Best Foreign Language Film
 1965 BAFTA Award for Best Foreign Actor – Marcello Mastroianni
 1964 Golden Globes – Samuel Goldwyn Award - nomination
 1964 David di Donatello Awards – David for Best Production – Carlo Ponti

See also
 List of submissions to the 37th Academy Awards for Best Foreign Language Film
 List of Italian submissions for the Academy Award for Best Foreign Language Film

References

External links

1963 films
1960s Italian-language films
1960s crime comedy films
Italian anthology films
Best Foreign Language Film Academy Award winners
Commedia all'italiana
Italian crime comedy films
Films about prostitution in Italy
Films based on works by Alberto Moravia
Films directed by Vittorio De Sica
Films set in Milan
Films set in Naples
Films set in Rome
Films with screenplays by Cesare Zavattini
Films produced by Carlo Ponti
Films scored by Armando Trovajoli
1963 comedy films
1960s Italian films